The Necessary Evil is a 1925 American silent drama film directed by George Archainbaud and starring Ben Lyon, Viola Dana, and Frank Mayo.

The film's sets were designed by the art director Milton Menasco.

Plot
As described in a film magazine review, Dick Jerome, adored of women and always forgiven of everything because of his good looks and disposition, has married the good and beautiful Frances, who was also loved by Dick's employer, David Devanant. Dick dies while assigned to South America, and David marries Shirley. David makes Dick's son Frank feel that he is an enemy. Frank learns of the method of his father's death and swears that he will break his stepfather. David sends Frank to South America, and he makes a man of himself. David writes a letter to his stepson, and when he returns he gives it to him to read. It provides to Frank proof of his father's unworthiness and states why David always acted as his stepson's enemy: so that he can face Frances in the beyond, knowing that he made a man of her son. Frank turns to find that David has died.

Cast

Preservation
With no prints of The Necessary Evil located in any film archives, it is a lost film. it is a lost film.

References

External links

1925 drama films
Silent American drama films
Films directed by George Archainbaud
American silent feature films
American black-and-white films
First National Pictures films
1920s American films
1920s English-language films